

The Grand Opera House (est.1888) of Boston, Massachusetts, was a theatre in the South End. Architect George Snell designed the 2,600-seat building on Washington Street. Managers and proprietors included Proctor & Mansfield, A.H. Dexter, George W. Magee, and Stair & Wilbur. Performances included Glyn's Three Weeks.

References

Further reading

External links

 Bostonian Society. Photo of Grand Opera House at 1176 Washington Street, ca. 1890

Images

Commercial buildings completed in 1888
1888 establishments in Massachusetts
South End, Boston
Former cinemas in the United States
Former theatres in Boston
Event venues established in 1888